Juancho Enriquillo Airport  is an agricultural airstrip  southwest of Enriquillo, a Caribbean coastal town in the Barahona Province of the Dominican Republic.

Caution: There are wind turbines midfield  either side of centerline.

See also 

Transport in Dominican Republic
List of airports in Dominican Republic

References

External links 
OpenStreetMap - Juancho Enriquillo Airport
Juancho Enriquillo Airport

Airports in the Dominican Republic
Buildings and structures in Barahona Province